The following lists events in the year 1998 in Hungary.

Incumbents
President: Árpád Göncz 
Prime Minister: Gyula Horn (until 6 July), Viktor Orbán (from 6 July)
Speaker of the National Assembly: Zoltán Gál (until 17 June), János Áder (from 18 June)

Events

May
May 10 - First round of 1998 Hungarian parliamentary election
May 24 - Second Round of 1998 Hungarian parliamentary election. Fidesz wins in coalition with FKGP and MDF.

July
July 2 - Bombing in Aranykéz utca, Budapest kills 4 people
July 6 - Viktor Orbán replaces Gyula Horn as Prime Minister of Hungary
July 8 - The First Orbán Government is formed

September
September 30 - Klaus Naumann, Chair of the NATO Military Committee visits Hungary

October
October 18 - Local elections in Hungary

Deaths

January 4 - Mihály Iglói
January 25 - Attila Zoller, 70, Hungary-American jazz guitarist.
January 27 - Miklos Udvardy, 78, Hungarian biologist and biogeographer.
February 6 - Ferenc Sidó
February 17 - Albert Wass, 90, Hungarian nobleman, novelist and poet, suicide.
June 17 - Gyula László
July 2 - Miklós Gábor
July 23 - André Gertler
August 15 - Károly Polinszky
October 27 - Klári Tolnay
November 6 - István Szőts
December 20 - Miklós Sárkány
December 21 - Béla Szőkefalvi-Nagy

See also
List of Hungarian films since 1990

References

 
1990s in Hungary
Hungary
Hungary